The 2018 season was the 106th season of competitive soccer in the United States.

National teams

Men's

Senior

Results and fixtures

Friendlies

Goalscorers
Goals are current as of November 20, 2018, after match against .

Managerial changes
This is a list of changes of managers:

U-20

2018 CONCACAF U-20 Championship

Group A

Qualification stage
The top two teams of each group in the qualification stage qualify for the 2019 FIFA U-20 World Cup, with the winners of each group also advancing to the final to decide the champions of the CONCACAF U-20 Championship.

Group G

Women's

Senior

Friendlies

2018 SheBelieves Cup

2018 Tournament of Nations

2018 CONCACAF Women's Championship

Group A

Semi-final

Final

Goalscorers
Goals are current as of November 13, 2018, after match against .

U-20

2018 CONCACAF Women's U-20 Championship

Group B

Semi-finals

Final

2018 FIFA U-20 Women's World Cup

Group C

U-17

2018 CONCACAF Women's U-17 Championship

On 22 April 2018, four days into the tournament, CONCACAF announced the remainder of the championship was cancelled immediately due to security concerns caused by civil unrest in Nicaragua. On 11 May 2018, CONCACAF announced the tournament would resume play on 6 June and conclude on 12 June 2018, with the remainder of the tournament hosted at the IMG Academy in Bradenton, Florida, United States. Six teams will play in the remainder of the tournament, as Nicaragua and Puerto Rico were already eliminated and were set to face each other in their last match.

Group B

Semi-finals

Finals

2018 FIFA U-17 Women's World Cup

Group C

Club Competitions

Men's

League Competitions

Major League Soccer

Conference tables 

 Eastern Conference

 Western Conference

Overall table

2018 table
Note: the table below has no impact on playoff qualification and is used solely for determining host of the MLS Cup, certain CCL spots, the Supporters' Shield trophy, seeding in the 2019 Canadian Championship, and 2019 MLS draft. The conference tables are the sole determinant for teams qualifying for the playoffs.

Aggregate 2017 and 2018 table

MLS Playoffs

MLS Cup

USL

Conference tables 
Eastern Conference

Western Conference

Playoffs

Cup Competitions

US Open Cup

Final

International Competitions

CONCACAF Competitions

teams in bold are still active in the competition

2018 CONCACAF Champions League

Round of 16

|}

Quarter-finals

|}

Semi-finals

|}

Women's

League Competitions

National Women's Soccer League

Overall table

NWSL Playoffs

United Women's Soccer

Honors

Professional

Amateur

See also 
United States Soccer Federation presidential election, 2018

References
US Soccer Schedule
US Soccer Results
Concacaf

 
Seasons in American soccer
Soccer
2018 sport-related lists